Manuel Bernardo Aguirre Samaniego (20 August 1908 – 4 April 1999) was a Mexican politician. He was secretary of agriculture (1970–1974) and governor of Chihuahua (state) (1974–1980). He was a member of the Institutional Revolutionary Party.

1908 births
1999 deaths
Governors of Chihuahua (state)
Presidents of the Chamber of Deputies (Mexico)
Mexican Secretaries of Agriculture
Members of the Senate of the Republic (Mexico)
Institutional Revolutionary Party politicians
Politicians from Chihuahua (state)
20th-century Mexican politicians